Adriano Miranda de Carvalho (born 22 June 1989), known as Adriano Miranda, is a Brazilian professional footballer who last played as an attacking midfielder for Tapajós.

Career
In 2006, he participated in the Copa da Juventude, a tournament arranged by a radio and television network in his home town Belém. Miranda, being the star of the competition, was contracted by the local team Clube do Remo. He won the Campeonato Paraense 2007 with this team.

At the beginning of 2008, he signed with the Bulgarian side Litex Lovech but left immediately on loan to FK Pelister playing in the Macedonian First League. On April 26, 2008, he scored a hat-trick against Pelister's greatest rivals FK Vardar bringing the first victory for his team in Skopje after 8 years, gaining great popularity in Bitola. Miranda was one of the best players for Pelister in the 2007–08 season when they finished third on the table. In August 2008, Mirsad Jonuz, the head coach of the Macedonian's national under-21 football team wanted to see this young player wear the Macedonian's jersey. If he agreed, a procedure would be started so he could get a Macedonian passport. On 22 December 2008, Miranda was named the Best foreign footballer in the Macedonian championship.

In the winter of 2009, he has been invited by Bulgarian side Spartak Varna to join a trial period, which began on 12 January. On 17th Miranda signed with Spartak on loan until the end of 2008–09 season. On 8 March 2009 he made his debut in Bulgarian A PFG in a match against Lokomotiv Mezdra. In this match Miranda his first goal in Bulgaria. In June 2009 he returned to Litex Lovech, but however, in early 2010 was sold to OFC Sliven 2000. Miranda left the team from Sliven after the end of the first half of the 2010–11 season and in late January 2011 he signed a contract with Brazilian club Tuna Luso.

Honours
 Campeonato Paraense: 2007
 Best foreign footballer in Macedonian First League: 2008

References

External links

 Macedonian Football 
 Makedonski sport 
 Adriano Miranda at ZeroZero

1989 births
Living people
Brazilian footballers
Clube do Remo players
PFC Litex Lovech players
PFC Spartak Varna players
OFC Sliven 2000 players
First Professional Football League (Bulgaria) players
Brazilian expatriate footballers
Expatriate footballers in Bulgaria
FK Pelister players
Expatriate footballers in North Macedonia
Brazilian expatriate sportspeople in Bulgaria
Association football midfielders
Sportspeople from Belém